Radovan "Rado" Trifunović (born 25 January 1973) is a Slovenian professional basketball coach and former player. He currently serves as the assistant coach for Fenerbahçe Beko of the Basketball Super League and the EuroLeague.

Coaching career

Slovenia (2017–2020)
On 10 October 2017, after Igor Kokoškov's contract expired, Trifunović was appointed the head coach of the Slovenian men's national team. Before he became Slovenia head coach, he has worked as an assistant coach under Kokoškov who led the team to the gold medal at the 2017 EuroBasket. 

On 28 March 2020, Basketball Federation of Slovenia parted ways with Trifunović.

References

External links 
 Eurobasket.com Profile

1973 births
Living people
Forwards (basketball)
Shaw Bears men's basketball players
Slovenian basketball coaches
Slovenian expatriate basketball people in the United States
Slovenian expatriate basketball people in Turkey
Basketball players from Ljubljana
Helios Suns players
KK Helios Domžale coaches